Mustafa Ahmed Ben Halim (29 January 1921 – 7 December 2021) was a Libyan politician and businessman who served in a number of leadership positions in the Kingdom of Libya from 1953 to 1960. Ben Halim was the Prime Minister of Libya from 12 April 1954 to 25 May 1957. Through his political and private sector work, he supported the development of the modern Libyan state.

Early life 
Ben Halim was born in exile in Alexandria, Egypt on 29 January 1921, where his Cyrenaican father sought refuge from the Italian occupation of Libya. He graduated with a B.S. in civil engineering from the Egyptian University of Alexandria in 1943.

Rise to power 
Ben Halim returned to Libya in 1950 to help with the reconstruction of the country following the Second World War and subsequent Allied occupation of Libya. He was appointed Minister of Public Works in Libya's first government in 1953. At the age of 33, he was appointed Prime Minister in 1954, a position he held until 1957. During his time as Prime Minister, Ben Halim supported the growth and development of modern-day Libya. He helped draft Libya's petroleum laws which ultimately led to the discovery of oil in 1959. Under his leadership, the Libyan oil sector was divided into a smaller number of concessions to support competition in the Libyan oil sector. Ben Halim also founded the University of Libya and the Central Bank of Libya.

As Prime Minister, Ben Halim prioritized building relationships and alliances with the West, notably Great Britain, the United States, and France. Due to these relationships, Ben Halim was able to secure aid for Libya from Great Britain and the United States at a time of heightened Cold War tensions. During his time as Prime Minister, Ben Halim established a positive diplomatic relationship with the Soviet Union which ultimately led to Libya's recognition at the United Nations which had been previously blocked by the USSR. In addition, Ben Halim collaborated closely with other Arab nations and neighboring countries, strengthening Libya's geopolitical position. In 1957, Ben Halim resigned as Prime Minister due to a lack of commitment from King Idris to move Libya towards a more open democracy. Despite these differences, Ben Halim and King Idris remained close over the coming years.

From 1957 to 1958, Ben Halim served as the Private Councillor to King Idris. He was later appointed Libyan Ambassador to France from 1958 to 1960 during which time he helped negotiate the French/Algerian truce between the FLN and the French Government.

Ben Halim returned to Tripoli and left public service in 1960 to start his own construction business. He set up the Libyan Company for Engineering and Construction (Libeco) with the U.S. company Brown and Root, and then expanded to form a partnership with Bechtel. He further diversified his interests with other ventures in manufacturing and natural resources, including setting up the Libyan Company for Soap and Chemicals and the Libyan Gas Company which supplied all of Libya's needs in nitrogen and oxygen. He diversified further into financials by co-founding the Bank of North Africa, a Libyan bank formed out of a joint venture with Morgan Guaranty Trust and the British Bank of the Middle East (BBME). He became Chairman of the Board of the new bank.

Between 1964 and 1968, Ben Halim served as an informal advisor to King Idris on institutional reforms which were proposed during his term as Prime Minister. Due to ongoing political pressure from special interest groups, the reforms were not fully implemented. In 1969, Ben Halim was on a family holiday in Switzerland when Muammar Gaddafi staged his coup. After Gaddafi took power, Ben Halim was unable to return to Libya. Over the next 15 years, Ben Halim was tried in absentia by the "People's Tribunal" for allegedly "corrupting political life".

Life in exile and return
Unable to return to Libya, Ben Halim briefly settled in London where he and his family were granted political asylum. He then moved to Beirut, Lebanon in 1970 to pursue new business ventures, including helping Consolidated Contractors Company negotiate sub-contracting agreements with the Bechtel Corporation, one of the largest civil engineering firms in the world. In 1973 a failed kidnapping attempt by mercenaries hired by Colonel Gaddafi forced him to relocate his family to London. In the years that followed, there were several assassination attempts made on Ben Halim's life which were foiled by British Intelligence.

Ben Halim was granted Saudi nationality in 1975, six years after King Faisal of Saudi Arabia granted the Ben Halim family passports to allow them to travel and conduct business in Lebanon and the United Kingdom. In 1980, he was appointed Personal Councilor to then Crown Prince Fahd bin Abdul Aziz of Saudi Arabia. Ben Halim was the last surviving of the Kingdom of Libya's premiers, and the only one of them who witnessed the fall of Muammar Gaddafi in 2011. After the fall of Gaddafi, Ben Halim returned to Libya after 42 years in exile. His homecoming was warmly received by the Libyan people. His house in Tripoli, which in 1969 was left in the custody of a sentry, was seized by the sentry who then claimed ownership of the property.

Personal life and death
Ben Halim was married to Yusra Kanaan. They had six children.
 Ben Halim's eldest son, Amr Ben Halim, is the Founder and a board member of Al Yusr Industrial Contracting Company. He also founded the Forum for Democratic Libya after the revolution in February 2011 to promote and advocate a culture of democracy. He has also supported other civil society organisations which aim to have a positive impact in post revolution Libya.
 Hany Ben Halim is a real estate developer and investor
 Tarek Mustafa Ben Halim, founded Alfanar, the Arab region's first venture philanthropy organisation, in 2004, after a career in investment banking. Tarek went back to Libya in 2005/6 to support Saif al-Islam Gaddafi in his attempts to bring about political reform. Tarek then resigned in 2008, as he was disenchanted with the lack of true intent to reform, and died in December 2009.
 Ahmed Ben Halim co-founded The Capital Partnership, an investment management firm, in 1998 following a career in banking and investment industries. He is also the founder and Chairman of Libya Holdings Group, an investment company focused on the development of Libya's energy, infrastructure and financial sectors.
 Abir Challah née Abir Ben Halim
 Sherine Ben Halim Jafar is an author. Her book "Under the Copper Covers", a culinary journey through North Africa and Middle East was published in 2015 by Rimal Publications

He turned 100 on 29 January 2021 and died on 7 December 2021.

Honours 

  Knight Grand Cordon of the Order of Idris I

Literature 
 Libya: The Years of Hope - The Memoirs of Mustafa Ahmed Ben-Halim - Former Prime Minister of Libya, 
"Libya's Hidden Pages of History: A Memoir - صفحات مطوية من تاريخ ليبيا السياسي" Rimal Publications, 2011 (Arabic Edition)  
"Libya's Hidden Pages of History: A Memoir" Rimal Publications, 2013 (English Edition)
Dictionary of Modern Arab History, an A-Z of over 2,000 entries from 1798 to the Present Day, by Robin Leonard Bidwell

References

External links
Forum for Democratic Libya

1921 births
2021 deaths
Egyptian centenarians
Libyan centenarians
Prime Ministers of Libya
People from Benghazi
Ambassadors of Libya to France
Transport ministers of Libya
Men centenarians
Egyptian emigrants
Immigrants to Libya